The Arch of Pietas (Latin : Arcus Pietatis) was an ancient Roman triumphal arch to the north of the Pantheon on the Campus Martius in Rome.

History
It may have been included in the portico surrounding the court in front of the Pantheon, between the baths of Nero and the temple of Matidia. The Mirabilia mentions it as being linked to the temple of Hadrian and near the churches of Santa Maria in Aquiro and the Maddalena.

See also
List of Roman triumphal arches
List of ancient monuments in Rome

Bibliography
Samuel Ball Platner and Thomas Ashby, A topographical dictionary of Ancient Rome, Oxford University Press, 1929
Lawrence Richardson, A New Topographical Dictionary of Ancient Rome, Johns Hopkins University Press, 1992, 488 p.

Pietas